Bouglé is a French surname. Notable people with the surname include: 

Célestin Bouglé (1870–1940), French philosopher 
Marie-Louise Bouglé (1883–1936), French feminist, librarian, and archivist

French-language surnames